Best of Soulhead is the first greatest hits album by Soulhead. It was their last album under the Sony Music Entertainment Japan sub-label onenation before moving to Avex. The album peaked at #5 on Oricon and remained on the charts for thirteen weeks.

Information
Best of Soulhead was released a year after their studio album, Naked, and was their last album under the SMEJ's sublabel onenation.

The album was released in both CD and CD+DVD format, with the CD+DVD being of limited edition. It also received a special "Winter Sleeve" limited edition.

The album contained previously unreleased music videos for One more time, I'm just going down and Feel Like Jumping.

Track listing
Adapted from Amazon

CD
"Step to the New World"
"Lover, Knight, Man"
"Oh My Sister"
"Sora"
"Get Up!"
"You can do that"
"No Way"
"At the Party"
"Fiesta"
"Sparkle☆Train"
"Got to leave"
"Pray"
"XXX feat. Koda Kumi"
"Kimi no Kiseki"
"Itsumademo…"
"Dear Friends"
"Feel Like Jumping"

DVD
"Step to the New World" (Music Video)
"Lover, Knight, Man" (Music Video)
"Sora" (Music Video)
"I'm just going down" (Music Video)
"Get Up!" (Music Video)
"You can do that" (Music Video)
"No Way" (Music Video)
"At the Party" (Music Video)
"Fiesta" (Music Video)
"Sparkle☆Train" (Music Video)
"Pray" (Music Video)
"XXX feat. Koda Kumi" (Music Video)
"FURUSATO" (Music Video)
"One more time" (Music Video)
"Kimi no Kiseki" (Music Video)
"Itsumademo…" (Music Video)
"Dear Friends" (Music Video)
"Feel Like Jumping" (Music Video)

References

2007 greatest hits albums
Soulhead albums
Sony Music compilation albums